Pascale Haiti is a former politician and government minister from French Polynesia.

Biography 
Haiti held the position of Minister of Handicrafts in the French Polynesian government. In 2009 Haiti was arrested as part of an investigation into corruption in the French Polynesian government.

Personal life 
Haiti is the partner of former President of French Polynesia, Gaston Flosse.

References 

Living people
Government ministers of French Polynesia
French Polynesian women in politics
Year of birth missing (living people)